The 12181 / 12182 Dayodaya Express is a Superfast Express train service running between  of Jabalpur in Eastern Madhya Pradesh and  of Rajasthan.
The Train was named 'Dayodaya' in honor of Dayanand Saraswati, who founded Arya Samaj in Ajmer.

Service

 12181 Dayodaya Express covers total journey of 1021 kilometers. At 21:00 it departs from Jabalpur Junction and at 14:20 it arrives at Ajmer Junction.
 12182 Dayodaya Express covers total journey of 1022 kilometers. At 15:25 it departs from Ajmer Junction and at 08:35 it arrives at Jabalpur Junction.

Route & Halts

Traction

It is hauled by a Tughlakabad-based WAP-7 electric locomotive from AII till KOTA. From KOTA till JBP it is hauled by a Itarsi-based WAP-7 electric locomotive and vice versa.

Direction reversal

The train reverses its direction 2 times :-

Rake sharing

The train shares its rake with 12191/12192 Jabalpur–H.Nizamuddin Express.

See also

 Jabalpur–H.Nizamuddin Express

External links
12181 Dayodaya Express at India Rail Info
12182 Dayodaya Express at India Rail Info

Transport in Jabalpur
Transport in Ajmer
Rail transport in Madhya Pradesh
Rail transport in Rajasthan
Railway services introduced in 2003
Express trains in India
Named passenger trains of India